Hannah Scott (born 10 March 1990) is a retired Australian rules footballer who played for the Western Bulldogs in the AFL Women's competition (AFLW). She was drafted by the Bulldogs with the club's third selection and the twenty first overall in the 2016 AFL Women's draft. She made her debut in Round 1, 2017, in the club inaugural match against  at VU Whitten Oval. It was revealed that Scott had signed a contract extension with the club on 16 June 2021, after playing 5 games for the club that season. In May 2022, Scott retired from the game after not playing a single game in the 2022 AFL Women's season due to injuries.

Statistics
Statistics are correct to the end of the 2021 season.

|- style=background:#EAEAEA
| scope=row | 2017 ||  || 22
| 7 || 1 || 0 || 68 || 21 || 89 || 15 || 23 || 0.1 || 0.0 || 9.7 || 3.0 || 12.7 || 2.1 || 3.3 || 3
|-
| scope=row bgcolor=F0E68C | 2018# ||  || 22
| 8 || 1 || 0 || 63 || 21 || 84 || 14 || 27 || 0.1 || 0.0 || 7.9 || 2.6 || 10.5 || 1.8 || 3.4 || 0
|- style=background:#EAEAEA
| scope=row | 2019 ||  || 22
| 7 || 0 || 0 || 70 || 11 || 81 || 12 || 18 || 0.0 || 0.0 || 10.0 || 1.6 || 11.6 || 1.7 || 2.6 || 1
|-
| scope=row | 2020 ||  || 22
| 5 || 0 || 0 || 38 || 12 || 50 || 12 || 15 || 0.0 || 0.0 || 7.6 || 2.4 || 10.0 || 2.4 || 3.0 || 0
|- style=background:#EAEAEA
| scope=row | 2021 ||  || 22
| 5 || 0 || 0 || 32 || 7 || 39 || 7 || 11 || 0.0 || 0.0 || 6.4 || 1.4 || 7.8 || 1.4 || 2.2 || 0
|- class=sortbottom
! colspan=3 | Career
! 32 !! 2 !! 0 !! 271 !! 72 !! 343 !! 60 !! 94 !! 0.1 !! 0.0 !! 8.5 !! 2.3 !! 10.7 !! 1.9 !! 2.9 !! 4
|}

References

External links

Living people
1990 births
Western Bulldogs (AFLW) players
Australian rules footballers from Victoria (Australia)
Sportswomen from Victoria (Australia)
All-Australians (AFL Women's)
Victorian Women's Football League players
Australian LGBT sportspeople
LGBT players of Australian rules football
Lesbian sportswomen